The White Rock Forge Covered Bridge or White Rock Covered Bridge is a covered bridge that spans the West Branch of the Octoraro Creek in southeast Lancaster County, Pennsylvania. A county-owned and maintained bridge, its official designation is the West Octoraro #2 Bridge. It was first built in 1847 by John Russell and Elias McMellen, but the original was destroyed and last rebuilt in 1884.  The wooden burr bridge crosses the West Branch of the Octoraro Creek. It is 103 feet long and 13 feet wide.

The bridge has a single span, wooden, double Burr arch trusses design with the addition of steel hanger rods.  The deck is made from oak planks.  It is painted red, the traditional color of Lancaster County covered bridges, on both the inside and outside.  Both approaches to the bridge are painted in the traditional white color.

The bridge's WGCB Number is 38-36-18.  Added in 1980, it is listed on the National Register of Historic Places as structure number 80003522.  It is located at  (39.82467, -76.09000).

Dimensions 
Length: 103 feet (31.4 m) span and 110 feet (33.5 m) total length
Width: 13 feet (4.0 m) clear deck and 15 feet (4.6 m) total width
Overhead clearance: 12 feet (3.7 m)
Underclearance: 13 feet (4.0 m)

Gallery

See also 
Burr arch truss
List of Lancaster County covered bridges

References

External links

Covered bridges in Lancaster County, Pennsylvania
Bridges completed in 1847
Bridges completed in 1884
Covered bridges on the National Register of Historic Places in Pennsylvania
1847 establishments in Pennsylvania
National Register of Historic Places in Lancaster County, Pennsylvania
Road bridges on the National Register of Historic Places in Pennsylvania
Wooden bridges in Pennsylvania
Burr Truss bridges in the United States